Alecu Văcărescu (1769–1798) was a Romanian Wallachian boyar and poet, a member of the Văcărescu family that gave Romanian literature its first poets. In 1796 a collection of his poems appeared in Romania.

He died as a prisoner in Istanbul in 1798. His son, Iancu Văcărescu, was also a poet.

See also
Văcărescu family

References

1769 births
1798 deaths
18th-century Romanian poets
Romanian male poets
Alecu
18th-century male writers